The 2019 Copa do Brasil first stage was the first stage of the 2019 Copa do Brasil football competition. It was played from 5 February to 3 April 2019. A total of 80 teams competed in the first stage to decide 40 places in the second stage of the 2019 Copa do Brasil.

Draw
The draw for the first and second stage was held on 13 December 2018, 20:00 at CBF headquarters in Rio de Janeiro. Teams were seeded by their CBF ranking (shown in parentheses). The 80 qualified teams were divided in eight groups (A-H) with 10 teams each. The matches were drawn from the respective confronts: A vs. E; B vs. F; C vs. G; D vs. H. The lower ranked teams hosted the first stage match.

Format
In the first stage, each tie was played on a single match basis. The lower CBF ranked team hosted the match. If tied, the higher CBF ranked team would advance to second stage.

Matches
All times are Brasília summer time, BRST (UTC−2), except the Aparecidense v Ponte Preta replay, BRT (UTC−3).

|}
Notes

Match 1

Match 2

Match 3

Match 4

Match 5

Match 6

Match 7

Match 8

Match 9

Match 10

Match 11

Match 12

Match 13

Match 14

Match 15

Match 16

Match 17

Match 18

Match 19

Match 20

Match 21

Match 22

Match 23

Match 24

Match 25

Match 26

Match 27

Match 28

Match 29

Match 30

Match 31

Match 32

Match 33

Match 34

Match 35

Match 36

Match 37

Match 38

Match 39

Match 40

References

2019 Copa do Brasil